Justin Bilyeu (born February 3, 1994) is a retired American soccer player.

Early career
Bilyeu attended soccer powerhouse program, Christian Brothers College High School in St. Louis, where he won a state championship in 2009, and was voted to the all-state team during his senior year. Bilyeu was voted to the inaugural High School All-American All-Star game in 2011. After high school, Bilyeu attended Southern Illinois University Edwardsville where he played in 59 games for the Cougars throughout his four-year career.

In 2015, Bilyeu made 7 appearances for Premier Development League club, FC Tucson.

Professional
On January 14, 2016 Bilyeu was selected by the New York Red Bulls in the first round of the 2016 MLS SuperDraft as the 18th pick. After a successful preseason, Bilyeu signed his first professional contract days before the 2016 season on March 3. On April 10, New York loaned Bilyeu to USL affiliate club, New York Red Bulls II. Hours later, Bilyeu made his first appearance with the club, coming on as a second-half substitute in a 4–0 victory against Bethlehem Steel FC.

Bilyeu made his professional debut with the senior team on April 29, during a 4–0 victory against FC Dallas. On June 15, Bilyeu made his first start for the senior team during a 1–0 victory against the Rochester Rhinos  in the U.S. Open Cup. On June 26, Bilyeu made his first MLS start in a 2–1 loss to Real Salt Lake. On July 19, in a 2–1 victory over FC Cincinnati with Red Bulls II, Bilyeu scored his first professional goal off a free kick, curling the ball into the lower left corner. Bilyeu was part of the 2016 USL Cup Champion Red Bull II side.

Bilyeu was waived by New York on June 28, 2017.

On August 2, 2017, Bilyeu signed with United Soccer League side Rio Grande Valley FC Toros. Bilyeu led the team with four assists. On October 5, Bilyeu was called up and made his Houston Dynamo debut in a friendly against Liga MX side Cruz Azul.

On March 7, 2018, Bilyeu signed with United Soccer League side Swope Park Rangers. Bilyeu missed all but 10 games during the 2018 campaign due to knee surgery.

On November 30, 2018, Bilyeu resigned with United Soccer League side Swope Park Rangers. However, due to ongoing concussion issues, Bilyeu retired from playing soccer on April 24, 2019.

Career statistics

References

External links

1994 births
Living people
American soccer players
FC Tucson players
Major League Soccer players
New York Red Bulls draft picks
New York Red Bulls players
New York Red Bulls II players
Rio Grande Valley FC Toros players
Sporting Kansas City II players
Association football defenders
SIU Edwardsville Cougars men's soccer players
Soccer players from St. Louis
USL Championship players
USL League Two players